Indianola may refer to:

Places in the United States
 Indianola, California (disambiguation)
 Indianola (Eureka), California
 Indianola, Florida
 Indianola, Georgia
 Indianola, Illinois
 Indianola, Iowa
 Indianola, Kansas, a former settlement in Kansas
 Indianola, Mississippi
 Indianola, Nebraska
 Indianola, Delaware County, Oklahoma
 Indianola, Pittsburg County, Oklahoma
 Indianola, Pennsylvania
 Indianola, Texas, a ghost town
 Indianola, Utah
 Indianola, Washington

Other
 Indianola (album), a 2007 album by Steve Azar
 Indianola Records, an American independent record label
 , an iron-clad ship of the American Civil War

See also
 

bg:Индианола